Pinehurst Lake is a lake in Northeastern Alberta.

References

Lac La Biche County
Lakes of Alberta